Sensory ataxic neuropathy, dysarthria, and ophthalmoparesis, also known as SANDO syndrome, is a very rare genetic disorder which is characterized by ocular and nerve anomalies.

Signs and symptoms 

This disorder is characterized by the adult-onset triad consisting of the following symptoms: sensory ataxic neuropathy, dysarthria, and ophthalmoparesis. MRIS often reveals white matter abnormalities and bilateral thalamus lesions. Other symptoms include generalized myopathy, epilepsy, and deafness.

Causes 

It is caused by autosomal recessive mutations in the POLG gene.

Epidemiology 

According to OMIM, approximately 29 cases have been described in medical literature. Most of these cases came from Europe.

References 

Genetic diseases and disorders
Rare genetic syndromes
Syndromes affecting the eye
Congenital disorders of eyes
Syndromes affecting the nervous system